Eugenia Mateianu (born 8 April 1936) is a Romanian fencer. She competed in the women's team foil event at the 1960 Summer Olympics.

References

External links
 

1936 births
Living people
Sportspeople from Chișinău
Romanian female fencers
Olympic fencers of Romania
Fencers at the 1960 Summer Olympics
20th-century Romanian women
21st-century Romanian women